Jonathan Stephenson (2 November 1950 – 21 December 2011) was an Irish nationalist politician.

A Protestant born in England and educated at Winchester College and Stanbridge Earls School, Stephenson moved to Northern Ireland, where he studied History and Politics at Queen's University Belfast. He joined the Social Democratic and Labour Party (SDLP) in the early 1980s, and became its first official press officer.

Stephenson was elected to Belfast City Council at the 1993 Northern Ireland local elections, representing the SDLP in the Castle area.  He also became Deputy Chairperson of the SDLP, serving from 1995 to 1998.

In 1995, he became the party's Chairperson, serving until 1998.  At the Northern Ireland Forum election in 1996, he did not stand in a constituency, but was elected as one of two regional list candidates for the SDLP, but he lost his council seat in 1997.

References

2011 deaths
Alumni of Queen's University Belfast
Members of Belfast City Council
Members of the Northern Ireland Forum
Protestant Irish nationalists
Social Democratic and Labour Party politicians
1950 births